Psilorhynchus arunachalensis is a species of torrent minnow. It is a freshwater benthopelagic fish and which is found in Arunachal Pradesh.

References

A
Taxa named by Kongbrailatpan Nebeshwar Sharma 
Taxa named by Kenjum Bagra
Taxa named by Debangshu Narayan Das
Fish described in 2007